Witchelina Nature Reserve, in South Australia, is situated on a former pastoral lease known as Witchelina that had operated as both a sheep station and cattle station, before being converted into a nature reserve by the Nature Foundation. The station gave its name to the locality of Witchelina.

The country is made up of gibber plains, red river gum and coolibah woodlands, bluebush shrubland, saltbush plains and acacia dunefields.

History
The traditional owners of the area are the Adnyamathanha and Arabunna peoples; Witchelina straddles of the boundary of both the groups' traditional lands. The property was first established as a sheep station by John Ragless in 1873.

Ragless' sons, Frederick and Richard, left Witchelina in 1882 with 2,500 sheep and three station hands to open up a property east of Lake Callabonna; after some poor seasons the brothers abandoned the run in 1886.

In 1915 the property was carrying a flock of approximately 4,000 sheep. The property was acquired by Sidney Kidman in partnership with Lewis and Pearce.

Following a heat wave in 1932 the station manager, Mr. Gourlay, trapped an estimated 100,000 rabbits, including 5,000 in a single night.

In 1949 the area had good rains, although several miles of boundary fence at Witchelina were washed away. The purchasers were A. S. Toll, E. G. and J. L. Boynthon, who had established the Myrtle Springs Pastoral company.

The  property was on the market in 2009. The property boasts a stone two storey homestead, a three bedroom manager's house, a ten-room shearers' quarters, a six stand stone shearing shed and significant shedding around the holding. The property is rated to carry either 6,600 head of cattle or 33,000 sheep.

In 2010 the property was purchased by Nature Foundation SA with two-thirds of the funds provided by a Federal Government grant via the Caring for Our Country program, with strong assistance from some private donors and State Government land purchase funds. The station was reported as being the state's largest private nature reserve, forming "a vital habitat link for Lake Torrens into the Northern Territory".

See also
 Hiltaba Nature Reserve
 List of ranches and stations

External links

References

Pastoral leases in South Australia
Stations (Australian agriculture)
Nature reserves in South Australia
Far North (South Australia)
1873 establishments in Australia
Gawler bioregion
Protected areas established in 2010